Mercury, being the closest to the Sun, with a weak magnetic field and the smallest mass of the recognized terrestrial planets, has a very tenuous and highly variable atmosphere (surface-bound exosphere) containing hydrogen, helium, oxygen, sodium, calcium, potassium and water vapor, with a combined pressure level of about 10−14 bar (1 nPa). The exospheric species originate either from the Solar wind or from the planetary crust. Solar light pushes the atmospheric gases away from the Sun, creating a comet-like tail behind the planet.

The existence of a Mercurian atmosphere was contentious until 1974, although by that time a consensus had formed that Mercury, like the Moon, lacked any substantial atmosphere. This conclusion was confirmed in 1974 when the unmanned Mariner 10 spaceprobe discovered only a tenuous exosphere. Later, in 2008, improved measurements were obtained by the MESSENGER spacecraft, which discovered magnesium in the Mercurian exosphere.

Composition 
The Mercurian exosphere consists of a variety of species originating either from the Solar wind or from the planetary crust. The first constituents discovered were atomic hydrogen (H), helium (He) and atomic oxygen (O), which were observed by the ultraviolet radiation photometer of the Mariner 10 spaceprobe in 1974. The near-surface concentrations of these elements were estimated to vary from 230 cm−3 for hydrogen to 44,000 cm−3 for oxygen, with an  intermediate concentration of helium. In 2008 the MESSENGER probe confirmed the presence of atomic hydrogen, although its concentration appeared higher than the 1974 estimate. Mercury's exospheric hydrogen and helium are believed to come from the Solar wind, while the oxygen is likely to be of crustal origin.

The fourth species detected in Mercury's exosphere was sodium (Na). It was discovered in 1985 by Drew Potter and Tom Morgan, who observed its Fraunhofer emission lines at 589 and 589.6 nm. The average column density of this element is about 1 cm−2. Sodium is observed to concentrate near the poles, forming bright spots. Its abundance is also enhanced near the dawn terminator as compared to the dusk terminator. Some research has claimed a correlation of the sodium abundance with certain surface features such as Caloris or radio bright spots; however these results remain controversial. A year after the sodium discovery, Potter and Morgan reported that potassium (K) is also present in the exosphere of Mercury, though with a column density two orders of magnitude lower than that of sodium. The properties and spatial distribution of these two elements are otherwise very similar. In 1998 another element, calcium (Ca), was detected with column density three orders of magnitude below that of sodium. Observations by the MESSENGER probe in 2009 showed that calcium is concentrated mainly near the equator—opposite to what is observed for sodium and potassium. Further observations by Messenger reported in 2014 note the atmosphere is supplemented by materials vaporized off the surface by meteors both sporadic and in a meteor shower associated with Comet Encke.

In 2008 the MESSENGER probe's Fast Imaging Plasma Spectrometer (FIPS) discovered several molecular and different ions in the vicinity of Mercury, including H2O+ (ionized water vapor) and H2S+ (ionized hydrogen sulfide). Their abundances relative to sodium are about 0.2 and 0.7, respectively. Other ions such as H3O+ (hydronium), OH (hydroxyl), O2+ and Si+ are present as well.  During its 2009 flyby, the Ultraviolet and Visible Spectrometer (UVVS) channel of the Mercury Atmospheric and Surface Composition Spectrometer (MASCS) on board the MESSENGER spacecraft first revealed the presence of magnesium in the Mercurian exosphere. The near-surface abundance of this newly detected constituent is roughly comparable to that of sodium.

Properties
Mariner 10 ultraviolet observations have established an upper bound on the exospheric surface density at about 105 particles per cubic centimeter. This corresponds to a surface pressure of less than 10−14 bar (1 nPa).

The temperature of Mercury's exosphere depends on species as well as geographical location. For exospheric atomic hydrogen, the temperature appears to be about 420 K, a value obtained by both Mariner 10 and MESSENGER. The temperature for sodium is much higher, reaching 750–1,500 K on the equator and 1,500–3,500 K at the poles. Some observations show that Mercury is surrounded by a hot corona of calcium atoms with temperature between 12,000 and 20,000 K. In the early 2000s, a simulation of Mercury's Na exosphere and its temporal variation was conducted to identify the source process that supplied crustal species to the exosphere. Processes like; evaporation, diffusion from the interior, sputtering by photons and energetic ions, chemical sputtering by photons, and meteoritic vaporization were tested. However, evaporation provides the strongest match when comparing the changes in the sodium exosphere with solar distance and time of day to the 2001 observations of Mercury's sodium tail.

Tails

Because of Mercury's proximity to the Sun, the pressure of solar light is much stronger than near Earth. Solar radiation pushes neutral atoms away from Mercury, creating a comet-like tail behind it. The main component in the tail is sodium, which has been detected beyond 24 million km (1000 RM) from the planet. This sodium tail expands rapidly to a diameter of about 20,000 km at a distance of 17,500 km. In 2009, MESSENGER also detected calcium and magnesium in the tail, although these elements were only observed at distances less than 8 RM.

Observation difficulties 
Mercury is the least explored planet of the inner Solar System due to the many difficulties of observation.  The position of Mercury as seen from Earth is always very close to the Sun, which causes challenges when trying to observe it.  The Hubble Space Telescope and other Earth-based space imaging systems have highly sensitive sensors so they can observe deep space objects.  They must not be directed toward the Sun, lest its powerful radiation destroy the sensors.

Instead, flyby and orbital missions to Mercury can study the planet and receive accurate data.  Even though Mercury is closer to Earth than Pluto is, the transfer orbit from Earth to Mercury requires more energy.  Mercury being so close to the Sun, space probes going there are accelerating as they approach, due to the Sun's gravitational pull.  This requires the use of retrorockets, which use fuel that the probe must carry instead of better instruments.

See also
Orders of magnitude (pressure)
Magnetosphere of Mercury

References

Notes

Bibliography

Mercury
Mercury (planet)